This article is a list of Heroes of the Soviet Union of North Caucasian origin.

Abazin

Avar 
 Kadi Abakarov
 
 
 
 
 Magomet Gadzhiev

Balkar 
 Alim Baisultanov
 Mukhazhir Ummayev ru

Cherkess 
 Aleksey Askarov ru
 Murat Kardanov ru
 Umar Habekov ru

Circassian 
 Husen Andrukhaev ru
 Aidamir Zchmizov ru
 Kamchari Bzhigakov ru
 Ali Koshev ru
 Daut Nekhai ru
 Ismail Tkhagushev ru
 Abubachir Chuts ru

Chechen 
 Irbaykhan Baybulatov
 Abukhadzhi Idrisov
 Khanpasha Nuradilov
 Khavazi Muhamed-Mirzaev
 Movlid Visaitov

Ingush 
 Ruslan Aushev

Dargin 
 Zulnukar Abdurakhmanov ru
 Sultan Alisultanov ru
 Sumen Kurbanov ru

Kalmyk 
 Erentsen Badmayev ru
 Bator Basanov ru
 Basan Gorodovikov ru
 Oka Gorodovikov
 Erdin Delikov ru
 Lidzhi Mandzhiyev ru
 Valery Ochirov ru
 Nikolai Sandzhirov ru
 Mikhail Selgikov ru
 Bimbel Khecheyev ru

Karachay 
 Kharun Bogatyryov
 Osman Kasayev

Kumykh

Lak 
 
 
 Musa Manarov

Lezgin

Meskhetian Turk

Tsakhur

References 

 
 Russian Ministry of Defence Database «Подвиг Народа в Великой Отечественной войне 1941—1945 гг.» [Feat of the People in the Great Patriotic War 1941-1945] (in Russian).

Heroes of the Soviet Union lists